William (Bill, Billy) Blyth(e) may refer to:

W. J. Blythe Jr. (born 1935), known as Bill, former member of the Texas House of Representatives

William Jefferson Blythe Jr. (1918–1946), biological father of Bill Clinton
 Bill Clinton (born William Jefferson Blythe III in 1946), 42nd President of the United States

 Billy Blyth (1895–1968), Scottish footballer

See also 
 Blythe (surname)